Dasysphinx is a genus of moths in the subfamily Arctiinae. The genus was erected by Felder in 1874.

Species
 Dasysphinx baroni Rothschild, 1910
 Dasysphinx boettgeri Rothschild, 1911
 Dasysphinx bombiformis Rothschild, 1911
 Dasysphinx flavibasis Gaede, 1926
 Dasysphinx garleppi Rothschild, 1911
 Dasysphinx mucescens Felder, 1869
 Dasysphinx ockendeni Rothschild, 1910
 Dasysphinx pilosa Rothschild, 1910
 Dasysphinx rubrilatera Gaede, 1926
 Dasysphinx semicincta Dognin, 1914
 Dasysphinx tarsipuncta Schaus, 1905
 Dasysphinx volatilis Schaus

References

External links

Euchromiina
Moth genera